The 1919 Southwest Texas State football team was an American football team that represented Southwest Texas State Normal School—now known as Texas State University–as an independent during the 1919 college football season. Better known for his basketball influences, Oscar W. Strahan became the university's first athletic director, and led the team to a 4–4 record in 1919. In a career spanning three decades, Strahan's teams posted a 72–52–10 record. This season also marked a departure from "academie football" as they entered the "college class." The team's captain was Bob Shelton, who played quarterback.

Schedule

References

Southwest Texas State
Texas State Bobcats football seasons
Southwest Texas State Bobcats football